Rapmasters: From Tha Priority Vaults, Vol. 2 is the second of an eight-volume budget Compilation series that Priority Records released throughout 1996 and 1997. As with the previous volume, Songs that had profane lyrics appeared in their censored versions however, Mad Flava's Feel Tha Flava and The Conscious Daughters' We Roll Deep both appear here fully uncut and uncensored.

Track listing
 Ghetto Bird (Ice Cube) 
 Feel Tha Flava (Mad Flava) 
 The Big Payback (EPMD) 
 Eazy-Duz-It (Eazy-E) 
 Early To Rise (Nice & Smooth) 
 Chocolate City (Da Lench Mob) 
 We Roll Deep (The Conscious Daughters) 
 Gangsta Gangsta (N.W.A) 
 Back In The Days (Paris)

References

1996 compilation albums
Priority Records compilation albums
Gangsta rap compilation albums
Hip hop compilation albums
Record label compilation albums